This is a list of prefects of Zagreb County.

Prefects of Zagreb County (1993–present)

See also
Zagreb County

Notes

External links
World Statesmen - Zagreb County